Gabrielle Lisa Thomas (born December 7, 1996) is an American track-and-field athlete, who specializes in the 100 and 200 meters sprint. She won an individual bronze medal and a team silver medal at the 2020 Summer Olympics in Tokyo.

Career
Thomas was born December 7, 1996, in Atlanta, Georgia to American mother Jennifer Randall and Jamaican father Desmond Thomas. She has a twin brother named Andrew. Thomas is African-American on her mother's side and Jamaican on her father's side. In 2007, Randall moved the family to Massachusetts to teach at the University of Massachusetts after completing her PhD at Emory University. While the family settled in Florence, Massachusetts, Thomas initially played softball and soccer, then joined the track and field team at the Williston Northampton School. Thomas was inspired to run by Allyson Felix, stating that her first memory of a track race was watching Felix while at her grandmother's house. In high school, Thomas ran all 4 years for Williston Northampton School, where she set multiple school records and was MVP every year.

A graduate of Harvard University, she studied neurobiology and global health as an undergraduate. While at Harvard, Thomas won 22 conference titles across her three years of athletics in six different events, setting the school and Ivy League records in the 100 meters, 200 meters, and the indoor 60 meters. She signed a contract with New Balance and turned pro in October 2018, forgoing her last year of collegiate eligibility.

After Harvard, she moved to Austin, Texas to be coached by Tonja Buford-Bailey. In May 2020, Thomas was provisionally suspended for three whereabouts failures, sanctioned with a two-year period of ineligibility. She submitted new evidence in June to invalidate one failure, and was finally cleared in July.

2021
Thomas experienced a health scare in 2021 when an MRI revealed a tumor on her liver, but it turned out to be benign. She is pursuing a master's degree at the University of Texas at Austin in epidemiology.

Thomas represented the United States in the 200 meter race at the 2020 Tokyo Olympics. Her time of 21.61 seconds in the event at the United States Olympic trials on June 26, 2021, was the second-fastest ever at the time, surpassed only by world record holder Florence Griffith-Joyner. The time even surprised Thomas herself; after the race, she said "It definitely changed how I view myself as a runner. I am still in shock... my dream was to make the Olympic team... Now that I've accomplished [that], I'm going to set higher goals."

On August 3, 2021, at the delayed 2020 Summer Olympics in Tokyo, Thomas won a bronze medal, running in the 200 m finals with a time of 21.87, behind Elaine Thompson-Herah (gold) and Christine Mboma (silver). Three days later, on August 6, 2021, the U.S. team having qualified for the finals of the 4 x 100 metres relay, Thomas ran anchor, and the team came in 2nd place behind the Jamaican team, securing her the silver medal along with teammates Javianne Oliver, Teahna Daniels, and Jenna Prandini.

2022
In March, Thomas came up with a good start to her outdoor season at the Texas Relays, with the fastest ever season opener by any 200m sprinter in history. She achieved the quickest wind-assisted mark of all time at 21.69 seconds (+3.1 m/s). She ran winning 10.92 s for the 100 meters just 45 minutes earlier.

Achievements

National competitions

Team USA

Circuit wins
 Diamond League meetings
 2018 (200 m): Lausanne Athletissima
 2019 (200 m): Lausanne

References

External links

 
 
  
 
 
 

Living people
American female sprinters
African-American female track and field athletes
Harvard University alumni
University of Texas at Austin alumni
1996 births
USA Outdoor Track and Field Championships winners
United States collegiate record holders in athletics (track and field)
Track and field athletes from Massachusetts
People from Northampton, Massachusetts
American sportspeople of Jamaican descent
People from Atlanta
Athletes (track and field) at the 2020 Summer Olympics
Medalists at the 2020 Summer Olympics
Olympic silver medalists for the United States in track and field
Olympic bronze medalists for the United States in track and field
Harvard Crimson women's track and field athletes
Olympic female sprinters
21st-century African-American sportspeople
21st-century African-American women